Helan (or Helaan) is a union council in Phalia Tehsil, Mandi Bahauddin District, Punjab province, Pakistan. The union council contains 10 villages (Helan, Charanwala, Burje, Kotli Qazi, Qutli, Dhingranwali, Binder Khurd, Rajoya, Saida Chak, Heger). Helan is 20 kilometers south-east of Mandi Bahauddin, 8 kilometers north-east of Phalia, 20 kilometers south of Dinga and 4 kilometers north of Mano Chak.

Villages in Phalia Tehsil
Villages in Mandi Bahauddin District